Julia Robinson (born 6 January 1998) is an Australian rugby league footballer who plays for the Brisbane Broncos in the NRL Women's Premiership and Wests Panthers in the QRL Women's Premiership. 

Background
Robinson was born in Ipswich, Queensland and played netball growing up.
Robinson attended Ferny Grove State High School graduating in 2015.

Playing career

2018
In 2018, Robinson began playing rugby league, representing the Australian Defence Force at the Women's National Championships. On 21 June, she signed with the Brisbane Broncos NRL Women's Premiership team.

In Round 1 of the 2018 NRL Women's season, Robinson made her debut for the Broncos in a 30–4 win over the St George Illawarra Dragons.

2019
In 2019, Robinson broke her leg in two places while playing for the Wests Panthers. The injury ruled her out of the Women's National Championships and the Women's State of Origin. She returned from her injury in Round 2 of the 2019 NRL Women's season.

Later that month, she represented Australia at the 2019 Rugby League World Cup 9s.

2020

2022
In September 2022, Robinson was named in the Dream Team announced by the Rugby League Players Association. The team was selected by the players, who each cast one vote for each position.

References

External links
Brisbane Broncos profile

1998 births
Living people
Australian female rugby league players
Australia women's national rugby league team players
Rugby league wingers
Rugby league centres
Brisbane Broncos (NRLW) players